Thelymitra alpina, commonly known as the mountain sun orchid, is a species of orchid that is endemic to south-eastern Australia. It has a single dark green leaf with a purplish base and up to twenty, usually blue to purplish flowers. It grows in alpine, subalpine and montane areas of New South Wales, the Australian Capital Territory and Victoria.

Description
The lobe on the top of the anther is brown with a yellow, inflated, tubular tip with a V-shaped notch on the end. The side lobes have dense, mop-like tufts of white or pink hairs. Flowering occurs from October to January.

Taxonomy and naming
Thelymitra alpina was first formally described in 2013 by Jeff Jeanes from a specimen collected in the Kosciuszko National Park and the description was published in Muelleria. The specific epithet (alpina) is a Latin word meaning "of high mountains".

Distribution and habitat

References

External links
 
 

alpina
Endemic orchids of Australia
Orchids of Victoria (Australia)
Orchids of the Australian Capital Territory
Orchids of New South Wales
Plants described in 2013